Hellinsia furfurosus is a moth of the family Pterophoridae. It is found in South Africa.

References

Endemic moths of South Africa
furfurosus
Moths of Africa
Insects of South Africa
Moths described in 1911